Cristina Estévez Lores (born 5 June 1986), commonly known as Xurru, is a Spanish football goalkeeper. She played for Levante UD, Valencia CF and Prainsa Zaragoza in Primera División, and she was a reserve goalkeeper for the Spanish national team in the 2009 European Championship qualifying.

References

External links
Profile at aupaAthletic.com

1986 births
Living people
Spanish women's footballers
Spain women's international footballers
Primera División (women) players
Levante UD Femenino players
Valencia CF Femenino players
Footballers from Aragon
Women's association football goalkeepers
21st-century Spanish women